Jingning She Autonomous County is an autonomous county for the She people, under the jurisdiction of the prefecture-level city of Lishui in the south of Zhejiang Province, China.

The postal code for the county is 323500. The government for the autonomous county is located at #19 Qianxi Road.

Administration
The county administers 2 subdistricts, 4 towns, and 15 townships.

Subdistricts 
 Hongxing
 Hexi

Towns 
 Bohai
 Dongkeng
 Yingchuan
 Shawan

Townships 
 Bohai
 Chengzhao
 Meiqi
 Zhengkeng
 Daji
 Jingnan
 Yanxi
 Luci
 Wutong
 Biaoxi
 Maoyang
 Qiulu
 Dadi
 Jiadi
 Jiulong

References

External links
 Official government site

Autonomous counties of the People's Republic of China
Lishui
She people
County-level divisions of Zhejiang